TV Sound and Image, British Television, Film and Library Composers 1956-80 is a 2012 compilation album released by Soul Jazz Records. The album consists of a style of music known as Library music, music developed by production houses with the intent that the recordings would be licensed to various film, television, and radio programs.

Release
TV Sound and Image was released by Soul Jazz Records on  July 3, 2012 by Soul Jazz Records. It was released on compact disc and as two separate vinyl releases.

Reception

From contemporary reviews, Stephen Thomas Erlewine of AllMusic found the album contained "a fair chunk of the classics from this golden age" with "sometimes perhaps tipping a little too heavily into the recognizable" but declared that it led to the soundtrack being not "only an entertaining nostalgia trip -- either for those who lived through the era or those who have always romanticized it -- but a good introduction to the pleasures of Library Music". Jim Carroll of The Irish Times gave the album a four-star review, noting that the music and themes have "endured long after plotlines or story arcs have been lost in the mists of time." and that how "the set of themes and incidental music is how downright funky some of those breaks were, a fact which has not escaped crate-diggers over the years." The review in the New Zealand Herald proclaimed it as a "inspired, head-nodding, and groove-generating stuff, though it sure owes a debt to Issac Hayes's 1969 classic Hot Buttered Soul." The review concluded that "every track is a killer, and other highlights, apart from Spiral and many of the well-known catchy ones, include Keith Papworth's fun-loving funk and bubbling bass tune Hardhitter and the lounge soul of Bullet's The Contract Man. This is more than just music to mooch too."

Track listing
Track listing adapted from back of album sleeve and liner notes.

References

Sources
 
 

2012 compilation albums
Soul Jazz Records compilation albums
Television soundtracks